Gülbahar Mükrime Hatun ("Rose of spring" and "hospitable"; died  1492), was consort of Sultan Mehmed II, and mother of Sultan Bayezid II.

Early life
The Ottoman inscription (vakfiye) describes her as Hātun binti Abdullah (Daughter of Abdullah), which means that her father was possibly a convert to Islam. According to one source, Gülbahar was of Pontic Greek origin and this view is also described to mother of sultan Selim I, Gülbahar Hatun, who shared the same name and this created a confusion between the two, while a Turkish legend claimed that she was a daughter of the king of France. However, Gülbahar was Albanian.

Marriage
Gülbahar married Mehmed in 1446, when he was still a prince and the governor of Amasya. She had two children, a son, Şehzade Bayezid (future Bayezid II) born in 1447 in Demotika, and a daughter, Gevherhan Hatun, born in 1446, who married Ughurlu Muhammad, a son of Aq Qoyunlu Sultan Uzun Hasan in 1474.

Due to their middle name in common, Gülbahar is sometimes confused with Sittişah Mukrime Hatun, another consort of Mehmed

In 1451, after Mehmed's accession to the throne, she followed him to Edirne. According to Turkish tradition, all princes were expected to work as provincial governors as a part of their training. In 1455 or 1456, Bayezid was appointed the governor of Amasya, and Gülbahar accompanied him, where the two remained until 1481, except for in 1457, when she came to Constantinople, and attended her son's circumcision ceremony.

Gülbahar was apparently quite concerned about the future of her son, and related to that, her own properties. In order to secure her properties, she endowed the incomes of certain villages and fields to the Enderun mosque in 1474. Among the endowed properties was the village of Ağılcık, which was turned back into a Timariot village in 1479 during the land reform.

In 1468, Mehmed gave the village of Bağluca to Gülbahar. After six years, in 1473, she sold the village to Taceddin Bey, son of Hamza Bali (died 1486), the book keeper of Bayezid's court. In 1478, the village's exemption was abolished and granted back to her probably as a result of the land reform. This order was reissued a year later at the request of Mevlana Şemseddin Ahmed according to which the village was not reverted to her, and she had likely become subject to a legal dispute.

Mother of the Sultan
Per custom, Gülbahar got the highest position in the imperial family after the sultan himself when her son, Bayezid ascended the throne in 1481 until her death in 1492. During her son's reign, she and the rest of the Imperial Family resided at the Old Palace (saray-ı atik) and were visited by the Sultan who on each visit used to pay his respect to his mother. In one case, Gülbahar complained of her son's rare visits and in a letter to her son wrote: 

Gülbahar had a considerable influence over Bayezid, for she used to make evaluations about the situation of some statesmen. Bayezid also valued his mother's words. In a letter written to him, she advises him against Hersekzade Ahmed Pasha, but favours his tutor Ayas Pasha and Hizirbeyoğlu Mehmed Pasha.

In 1485, Bayezid endowed a mosque, and a school in Tokat in the memory of Gülbahar Hatun.

Death
Gülbahar Hatun died in 1492, and was buried in Fatih Mosque, Istanbul. The tomb was damaged in the 1766 Istanbul earthquake, and was rebuilt in 1767–1768.

Issue
By Mehmed II, Gülbahar Hatun had at least a daughter and a son:
Gevherhan Hatun (1446 - 1514). Married at least one time, she had a son.
Bayezid II (3 December 1447, Didymoteicho - 10 June 1512, Edirne). Sultan of the Ottoman Empire.

In popular culture
In the 2012 film, Fetih 1453, Gülbahar Hatun is portrayed by Turkish actress Şahika Koldemir.
In the 2013 Turkish series Fatih, Gülbahar Hatun is played by Turkish actress Seda Akman.

See also
Ottoman Empire
Ottoman dynasty
List of consorts of the Ottoman Sultans

References

Sources

External links

15th-century consorts of Ottoman sultans
1434 births
1492 deaths
Mehmed the Conqueror
Valide sultan
15th-century Albanian people
Albanians from the Ottoman Empire